Cyril George Paskell (20 January 1927 – 11 July 2009) was a New Zealand rugby league player. A , Paskell represented Canterbury at a provincial level, and was a member of the New Zealand national team in 1953. He played one test match for New Zealand against Australia.

References

1927 births
2009 deaths
New Zealand rugby league players
New Zealand national rugby league team players
Canterbury rugby league team players
Rugby league wingers